Neversoft Entertainment, Inc. was an American video game developer based in Woodland Hills, California. The studio was founded by Joel Jewett, Mick West and Chris Ward in July 1994 and was acquired by Activision in October 1999. Initially, the studio worked with Playmates Toys, where they worked on the game Skeleton Warriors, which was based on a animated television series of the same name. Throughout 1996, the studio grew, and worked on projects with Crystal Dynamics and Sony Computer Entertainment, but due to internal conflicts, they were cancelled.

After a meeting with Activision in 1998, the publisher agreed to enter into a deal with the studio to create Apocalypse, which used the game engine created by Neversoft for one of the cancelled Sony projects. During the game's development, Activision asked the studio to work on a prototype for a skateboarding game, and after an impressed reaction from Activision to the prototype, the publisher released the game as Tony Hawk's Pro Skater in 1999 to critical acclaim and acquired Neversoft at the end of that year. Neversoft developed a Spider-Man game for the PlayStation the following year, along with six Tony Hawk's games over the next several years.

In 2004, the company split into two teams to work on two games at once, the upcoming Tony Hawk's and a new intellectual property, the western action-adventure game Gun. After Activision's acquisition of Guitar Hero in 2006, Neversoft continued the franchise, working on Guitar Hero III: Legends of Rock, which was released in 2007 to similar acclaim to previous games in the franchise. With the game's success, Neversoft focused on developing new Guitar Hero games, passing development of new Tony Hawk's to Robomodo. The last game in the franchise by Neversoft was Guitar Hero: Warriors of Rock in 2010, which received mixed reviews and sold poorly. Due to this, Activision reduced Neversoft to a support studio for future Call of Duty games.

Starting in 2011, the studio worked in collaboration with numerous Activision studios on Call of Duty: Modern Warfare 3 and Call of Duty: Ghosts, and following the release of the latter, Neversoft was merged with Infinity Ward on May 3, 2014, and was made defunct on July 10, 2014. The last game the studio worked on was Call of Duty: Advanced Warfare, developed with Sledgehammer Games and released later that year.

History
Neversoft was founded in July 1994 by three employees of Malibu Interactive (previously Acme Interactive), a division of Malibu Comics based in Westlake Village, California. At that time, the primary platforms were the home gaming consoles, the Genesis/Mega Drive and the Super Nintendo Entertainment System. Games for these systems could be developed by small teams, anywhere from two to ten developers. As a result, it was much easier than at present to set up a game development company, and several groups of people had already left Malibu to strike out on their own. Joel Jewett, a native of Montana and a CPA, was at the time head of development at the rapidly shrinking Malibu Interactive. He teamed up with Mick West, a game programmer, who had just completed working on BattleTech: A Game of Armored Combat for the Genesis, and Chris Ward, a video game artist.

In July 1994, Neversoft was formed. They initially found work for Playmates Interactive, a then-division of Playmates Toys who were about to release a line of toys called Skeleton Warriors and wanted a video game to go along with the toys and the cartoon series. Neversoft began work on the game design and moved into offices in Woodland Hills, California. Neversoft worked on the Genesis version for five months. Over that time they hired another artist and a level designer. In December 1994, Playmates cancelled the game. They were not unhappy with the progress, but had decided that they needed to develop the game for the Sega Saturn. 1995 was spent developing Skeleton Warriors for the Sega Saturn. Over the course of 1995, Neversoft grew rapidly by hiring three programmers, five artists, a level designer, a tester and an office administrator. Skeleton Warriors was finished in time for the 1995 holiday season and Neversoft began looking for other work while they ported Skeleton Warriors to the PlayStation in 1996.

Neversoft continued to expand during 1996, expanding to over twenty employees. They worked for six months on a game based on Ghost Rider for Crystal Dynamics, which was cancelled due to financial problems with the publisher. With some excess capacity Neversoft started to develop a game of their own design, initially called Big Guns. The technology developed there was used in their next project, a conversion of the PC game MDK. Towards the end of 1996, Neversoft sold the idea for Big Guns to Sony Computer Entertainment and they began development. 1997 was a tumultuous year for Neversoft. The MDK conversion took far longer than expected, and the Big Guns game (renamed Exodus) went through numerous design changes at the behest of Sony and was cancelled in November 1997. The company shrunk back to just twelve employees. Neversoft spent the next few months shopping around their technology, meeting with numerous companies and looking for work.

In January 1998, just as Neversoft was about to run out of money, they had a meeting with Activision, who were looking for someone to re-develop Apocalypse, a failed internal project. The technology developed for Big Guns turned out to be ideal for the project, Activision was impressed and Neversoft began work on Apocalypse. In May 1998, Apocalypse was going very well, and Activision signed up Neversoft to develop a prototype for a skateboarding game. This proceeded slowly as they could not spare many people from Apocalypse. The initial prototypes resembled the arcade game Top Skater. Apocalypse wrapped up in October 1998 and development began in earnest on Tony Hawk's Pro Skater for the PlayStation and Nintendo 64. By the end of 1998, the game development was in full swing and Neversoft comprised 16 people: six programmers, five artists, three level designers, one producer and Joel, the company's president.

From 1999 to 2007, Neversoft developed nine Tony Hawk's Pro Skater games and increased their employees to over 150.

In 2005, Neversoft developed a Western action-adventure open world game entitled Gun, alongside Beenox and Rebellion Developments.

In 2006, Activision acquired the Guitar Hero series from Harmonix Music Systems, as well as RedOctane, and chose Neversoft as the developer. Neversoft developed several games in the franchise, breaking several records with Guitar Hero III: Legends of Rock. The games following Guitar Hero: Warriors of Rock would be developed by Vicarious Visions, developers of the Wii ports and Guitar Hero: Van Halen. In light of this, 50 employees were laid off on February 11, 2010. In May 2014 it was reported that Neversoft had been merged with Call of Duty creators Infinity Ward to create what was internally referred to as a "super-studio".

Neversoft was officially made defunct on July 10, 2014, 20 years to the day of its founding, with the remaining employees attending a burning of a sculpture of the skewered eyeball from their logo that has been part of their offices before.

Release history
Tony Hawk's Pro Skater (THPS) was released on the PlayStation in August 1999. Development of a sequel began immediately after its release. Spider-Man was also developed for Activision in 2000. Like THPS, the technology for this game was based on the Apocalypse engine, which was in turn based on the Big Guns engine. Neversoft was now developing two major games in parallel, and expanded into two large teams. Activision acquired Neversoft in the summer of 1999 in a stock swap deal. The founders of Neversoft and several key employees signed four-year employment agreements.

Tony Hawk's Pro Skater 2 and Spider-Man were both released in 2000. Neversoft began work on Tony Hawk's Pro Skater 3 specifically for the PlayStation 2. After both teams finished their projects they were merged into one large team. THPS3 was developed using the RenderWare game engine. Tony Hawk's Pro Skater 3 was released in 2001, followed by Tony Hawk's Pro Skater 4 in 2002. In 2003 Neversoft reworked the game with a more story-oriented approach in Tony Hawk's Underground, followed by a sequel in Tony Hawk's Underground 2 in 2004. In 2005 Neversoft again split into two teams to begin work on the internally developed Gun and the seventh version of the Tony Hawk's series — Tony Hawk's American Wasteland.

Tony Hawk's Project 8 was developed and released in 2006. This was the first title under Neversoft that was developed as a next-gen title for the Xbox 360 and the PlayStation 3. Tony Hawk's Proving Ground was released in 2007. It is the second title for the PlayStation 3 and third for Xbox 360 in the Tony Hawk's series. It was the last Tony Hawk game to be developed by Neversoft; the franchise moved to Robomodo.

After Activision acquired RedOctane and the Guitar Hero series, Harmonix developed their last Guitar Hero game, Guitar Hero Encore: Rocks the 80s, before they were acquired by MTV. Neversoft became the developer for the Guitar Hero series beginning with Guitar Hero III: Legends of Rock for the Xbox 360 and PlayStation 3 consoles, using their in-house game engine made from scratch instead of Harmonix's engine. Several Guitar Hero series games have been developed by Neversoft since 2007, including Guitar Hero III: Legends of Rock, Guitar Hero: Aerosmith, Guitar Hero World Tour (incorporating drums and vocals alongside guitar), Guitar Hero: Metallica, Guitar Hero 5, Band Hero and Guitar Hero: Warriors of Rock.

Games developed

Notes

References

External links
 Neversoft's profile at MobyGames

Defunct Activision subsidiaries
Companies based in Los Angeles
Video game companies established in 1994
Video game companies disestablished in 2014
1999 mergers and acquisitions
Defunct companies based in Greater Los Angeles
Defunct video game companies of the United States
Video game development companies
Former Vivendi subsidiaries